Mushindamo District, commonly misspelled Mushindano, is a district of North-Western Province, Zambia. It was created from part of Solwezi District in 2016. However, as of 2021, it is not clear where the Mushindamo Central Business District is to be located.

The current whole area of Mushindamo district covers what was previously known as Solwezi East Constituency for electoral purposes under the Electoral Commission of Zambia. Mushindamo as Solwezi East, the current Solwezi and Kalumbila districts then as Solwezi Central and Solwezi West respectively, formed what was the larger Solwezi district before it was split up to create the three independent districts. In the Zambian National Assembly, the three legislators representing these areas are still addressed using the old names as Solwezi West, Solwezi Central and Solwezi East Members of Parliament.

References 

Districts of North-Western Province, Zambia